Antaeotricha periphrictis is a moth of the family Depressariidae. It is found in Guyana.

The wingspan is about 18 mm. The forewings are glossy grey with the extreme costal edge whitish, passing into a fine waved whitish line running around the apex and termen. There is a cloudy somewhat darker spot on the end of the cell, and a whitish mark beneath it. The hindwings are grey.

References

Moths described in 1915
periphrictis
Moths of South America